The Postman Always Rings Twice may mean:
 The Postman Always Rings Twice (novel), a 1934 crime novel by James M. Cain
 The Postman Always Rings Twice (1946 film), a drama-film noir based on the novel
 The Postman Always Rings Twice (1981 film), a drama based on the novel
 The Postman Always Rings Twice (opera), a 1982 opera based on the novel